Thomas Sewell is an Australian neo-Nazi and convicted criminal. He is the leader of the National Socialist Network, the European Australian Movement and founder of the Lads Society. The groups led by Sewell focus on promoting white supremacy and far-right activism in Australia. He is known for associating with other prominent neo-Nazis and for controversial public stunts such as cross-burning. In 2017 Sewell attempted to recruit the perpetrator of the 2019 Christchurch mosque shootings into the Lads Society.

In May 2021, Sewell was arrested by counter-terrorism police in Melbourne's east and faced a Melbourne court over an alleged armed robbery in Victoria's Cathedral Range.

In December 2022, Sewell was found guilty of affray and recklessly causing injury after punching a security guard multiple times in the face at the headquarters of Channel 9 in Melbourne. The force and repetition of the punches caused the security guard to fall to the ground and smash his head into the pavement, where Sewell continued to punch him repeatedly in the face. In January 2023, Sewell was sentenced to an 18-month community corrections order with 150 hours of community.

In December 2022, investigative journalism uncovered that Sewell had groomed children into neo-Nazism.

Sewell was featured in the documentary Revealed: Amongst Us – Neo Nazi Australia, exploring the rise in neo-nazism in Australia. Sewell is New Zealand-born.

Political views
Sewell is a neo-Nazi. He is associated with other well-known far-right neo-Nazi extremists, including Neil Erikson of the United Patriots Front and the Lads Society, the latter of which Sewell was a founding member.

In 2017, Thomas Sewell asked Brenton Harrison Tarrant (the perpetrator of the 2019 Christchurch mosque shootings) to join the Lads Society, but Tarrant refused.

Videos leaked to the press in November 2019 revealed Sewell's aim to attract and recruit members from mainstream society under the guise of a men's fitness club. His white supremacist agenda was clearly shown as he outlined plans which included the creation of “Anglo-European” enclaves in Australian cities, encouraging the “speed and ferocity of the decay” of society to help foment a "race war" by tactics including exploiting issues raised by politicians.

Activities 
Sewell served in the Australian Defence Force.

Sewell was the founder of the Lads Society, a now-defunct far-right white nationalist group, and is the leader of the neo-Nazi National Socialist Network.

Australia Day get-together
In January 2021, over the Australia Day weekend, 38 members of Sewell's European Australia Movement chanted "white power" and shouted Sieg Heil and other racist slogans at passers-by. The group were photographed throwing Roman salutes and holding a cross burning — a ritual usually associated with the Ku Klux Klan in the United States — next to Lake Bellfield at the foot of the Grampians in western Victoria. The group's actions drew the attention of local police and intelligence officers from Victoria Police's Counter-Terrorism Command.

Counter-terrorism charges
On 14 May 2021, Sewell was charged after a raid by counter-terrorism police at a house in the Melbourne suburb of Rowville. Sewell was charged with armed robbery, robbery, theft, criminal damage, affray with a face covering, affray, assault with a weapon, violent disorder, common law assault and committing an indictable offence while on bail. Sewell faced court on 2 August and was remanded to appear in Melbourne magistrates' court; Sewell “was released pending further inquiries”. The charges concerned an alleged violent armed robbery in Victoria's Cathedral Range. Sewell and up to 15 other masked men allegedly attacked two passengers in a car and smashed windows. Sewell's Blood was found inside the car. He has since been released on bail.

March 2021: Assault
In March 2021, a report on far-right extremism by A Current Affair was aired. An hour before the report was aired, Sewell and Jacob Hersant, a neo-nazi associate, arrived at the Nine Network office in Melbourne and demanded to speak to staff regarding the program. After being told to leave the premises, Sewell repeatedly punched a security guard in the face causing him to fall to the ground, where Sewell continued to punch him in the face repeatedly. The incident was filmed and later posted on social media by Sewell himself. The attack drew condemnation from Victorian Premier Daniel Andrews, who labelled it "sickening".

Victoria Police's counter-terrorism command charged Sewell with affray, recklessly causing injury and unlawful assault.

In December 2022, Sewell contested charges of affray, recklessly causing injury, and unlawful assault in the Melbourne Magistrates Court. He attended with several supporters, including Blair Cottrell. Other supporters, including Neil Erikson, watched the proceedings online. The following week, Sewell was found guilty of affray and recklessly causing injury. On January 12 2022, Sewell was sentenced to an 18-month community corrections order with 150 hours of community.

March 2023: Anti-trans rally outside Parliament House
On 18 March 2023, Sewell organized and attended a rally in Melbourne alongside 30 other neo-Nazis, including members of the NSN, in support of British women's rights activist Kellie-Jay Keen-Minshull, who spoke at the rally while visiting the city on her Australian and New Zealand tour. Sewell and other members of the NSN marched down Spring Street, displayed a banner that read "DESTROY PAEDO FREAKS", performed Nazi salutes on the stairs of Parliament House, and referred to transgender people as paedophiles. A counterprotest in support of transgender rights, attended by many students, transgender activists, and socialists, clashed with the group. While the police, including several mounted officers, attempted to separate the two groups, there were some interactions (many of which were violent), and it was reported that pepper spray was used at least once. The events were condemned by the Labor Party, the Liberal Party (although Liberal MP Moira Deeming who has a track record of transphobic views was present at the rally) and the Greens. The Australian Jewish Association (AJA) issued a statement stating that the Nazis had disrupted Keen's "Let Women Speak" protest, which led to the women's rally dispersing early. The AJA said "The "Let Women Speak" organisers had nothing to do with the Nazis".

References

Further reading 

Alt-right activists
1993 births
Living people
Australian neo-Nazis
 
Australian people of New Zealand descent